Marc Roca Junqué (born 26 November 1996) is a Spanish professional footballer who plays as a central midfielder for Premier League club Leeds United.
 
He started his career at Espanyol, appearing in 121 competitive matches and four La Liga seasons. In October 2020, he signed with Bayern Munich.

Roca won the 2019 European Under-21 Championship with Spain.

Club career

Espanyol
Born in Vilafranca del Penedès, Barcelona, Catalonia, Roca joined RCD Espanyol's youth setup in 2008, aged 11. He started his career at Espanyol, appearing in 121 competitive matches and four La Liga seasons. On 24 August 2014, he made his senior debut with the reserves, starting in a 2–2 Segunda División B home draw against Lleida Esportiu.

Roca scored his first senior goal on 17 January 2015, his team's second in a 2–3 home loss to UE Olot. On 4 August he renewed his contract until 2017, and was promoted to the B side shortly after.

On 26 August 2016, Roca made his first-team – and La Liga – debut, starting in a 2–2 home draw against Málaga CF. On 11 November, he agreed to an extension until 2022 and was permanently promoted to the main squad the following season.

Roca scored his first goal in the top flight on 21 April 2019, in a 2–2 draw at Levante UD. He played 44 matches across all competitions in the 2019–20 campaign, but the club was relegated to Segunda División for the first time in 26 years.

Bayern Munich
On 4 October 2020, Roca signed for FC Bayern Munich on a five-year contract. He made his official debut 11 days later, in a 3–0 defeat of amateurs 1. FC Düren in the first round of the DFB-Pokal. He appeared in his first Bundesliga match later that month, coming on as an injury-time substitute for Serge Gnabry in the 2–1 away victory over 1. FC Köln.

Roca played his first-ever game in the UEFA Champions League on 25 November 2020, starting and being sent off for two bookable offences midway through the second half on an eventual 3–1 group stage win against FC Red Bull Salzburg. He totalled only 11 appearances in his first season.

Roca featured slightly more in 2021–22 as his team won the league again, but was once again a fringe first-team player.

Leeds United
On 17 June 2022, Leeds United announced that Roca would join the club on 1 July after an agreement was reached with Bayern Munich; he agreed to a four-year contract for a reported €12,000,000 fee that could eventually rise up on add-ons. He made his Premier League debut on 6 August, starting in a 2–1 home victory over Wolverhampton Wanderers. He scored his first goal one month later, in the 5–2 away defeat to Brentford.

International career
On 28 December 2016, Roca made his debut for the Catalonia autonomous team, starting in a 3–3 draw against Tunisia (4–2 penalty loss). He was named in Spain's under-21 squad for the 2019 UEFA European Championship, starting the final three games of the tournament for the eventual winners including a 4–1 semi-final victory over France in which he scored.

Career statistics

Club

Honours
Espanyol
Segunda División: 2020–21

Bayern Munich
Bundesliga: 2020–21, 2021–22
FIFA Club World Cup: 2020

Spain U21
UEFA European Under-21 Championship: 2019

References

External links

1996 births
Living people
People from Vilafranca del Penedès
Sportspeople from the Province of Barcelona
Spanish footballers
Footballers from Catalonia
Association football midfielders
La Liga players
Segunda División players
Segunda División B players
RCD Espanyol B footballers
RCD Espanyol footballers
Bundesliga players
FC Bayern Munich footballers
Premier League players
Leeds United F.C. players
Spain youth international footballers
Spain under-21 international footballers
Catalonia international footballers
Spanish expatriate footballers
Expatriate footballers in Germany
Expatriate footballers in England
Spanish expatriate sportspeople in Germany
Spanish expatriate sportspeople in England